Vladimir Kaspé (3 May 1910 – 7 October 1996) was an ethnic Russian, Mexican national architect, teacher, and writer. He was the younger brother of Simon Kaspe. He was married to Masha Shapiro.

He was born in Harbin, China on 3 May 1910. He moved to Paris in 1926 and studies at the Ecole des Beaux-Arts from 1929 to 1935. There, his teacher was Georges Gromort. In 1942 he moved to Mexico.

In 1948 the Súper Servicio Lomas Building, which he designed, opened. He designed the Albert Einstein Secondary School (Escuela Albert Einstein) in Mexico City, which was in development from 1944 to 1946, and opened in 1949. It was one of his first commissions. With J. Hanhausen, he designed the Facultad de Economia in the Ciudad Universitaria, Mexico City, which was completed in 1953. He also designed the Liceo Franco Mexicano in Mexico City, which opened in 1950. Jane Turner, the author of Encyclopedia of Latin American and Caribbean art, wrote that his educational architecture was "notable for their formal austerity". He died in Mexico City on 7 October 1996.

Legacy
The Vladimir Kaspé Cultural Center was designed by Jorge Hernandez de la Garza.

References

Further reading
 Noelle, Louise. Vladimir Kaspe: reflexion y compromiso. Universidad La Salle, 1995. , 9789687651040.

External links
  "Vladimir Kaspé" (Archive) Lycée Franco Mexicain.
  "La obra de Vladimir Kaspé en Polanco" (" (Archive). Discurso Visual, Centro Nacional de las Artes CENART (ES), Secretariat of Public Education.

1996 deaths
1910 births
Mexican people of Russian-Jewish descent
20th-century Mexican architects
Chinese emigrants to France
French emigrants to Mexico